Keware may refer to:
 Keware, Mawal, Pune district, Maharashtra, India
 Keware Bhanjyang, Nepal

See also 
 Ke ware, a type of Chinese cheladon